Samuel Gutekunst (born May 20, 1984) is a former American football offensive tackle who is currently a free agent.

Gutekunst has also been a member of the Frankfurt Galaxy, Berlin Thunder, Baltimore Ravens, Jacksonville Jaguars and Seattle Seahawks.

Gutekunst first started his career with the Heiligenstein Crusaders in Heiligenstein (Germany). After being scouted for the Rheinland Pfalz / Saarland junior all-star team, he transferred  to the Saarland Hurricanes where he played for the GFL-juniors in  2003 and subsequently for the seniors in the GFL throughout the 2005 season. While being involved with the Saarland Hurricanes, Gutekunst was an offensive line coach for the Rheinland Pfalz / Saarland all-star team 2004/05 as well as for the Heiligenstein Crusaders during the 2004 season.

Gutekunst was assigned twice to the Frankfurt Galaxy as a National Player in 2005 and 2006, starting two games during his first and five in his second season, where he won the Worldbowl in the NFL Europe Championship Game against the Amsterdam Admirals at LTU-Arena (Düsseldorf).

Because of his efforts, he advanced to the NFL through the International Practice Squad Program with the Baltimore Ravens in 2006. As a part of the Ravens Practice Squad he went to the Playoffs and won the AFC North. By losing the divisional playoffs to the Indianapolis Colts (15-6), the Ravens were only two games short of attending the Super Bowl. The Ravens ended the season with an overall record of 13–4.

After returning to NFL Europe, Gutekunst was assigned to the Berlin Thunder where he started eight games of the 2007 season, missing two with ruptures in his right foot. Following the 2007 season, NFL Europe was shut down.
 
As a part of the developmental program, Gutekunst went back to the NFL with the Jacksonville Jaguars where he spent the 2007 season going to the playoffs for the second time as a part of the Jaguars practice squad.

As a free agent, Gutekunst was assigned to the Seattle Seahawks in 2008 but missed training camp and the 2008 season after sustaining an injury to his lower back. He was drafted in the UFL Premiere Season Draft in 2009 for the New York Sentinel Franchise, but was unable to attend because of his back injury.

Gutekunst now works for SAP in Germany.

External links
Just Sports Stats
Jacksonville Jaguars bio
Seattle Seahawks bio

1984 births
Living people
Sportspeople from Karlsruhe
German players of American football
American football offensive tackles
Frankfurt Galaxy players
Berlin Thunder players
Jacksonville Jaguars players
Baltimore Ravens players
Seattle Seahawks players